The  is a railway line on the Sea of Japan coast of central Japan. It is operated by West Japan Railway Company (JR West).

The city of Obama and the towns of Mihama, Wakasa, Ōi and Takahama are located in the central section of the line.

History
The Tsuruga - Tomura section opened in 1917, and the line was then extended westward to Obama in 1918, Wakasa-Takahama in 1921 and connected to the Maizuru Line at Higashi-Maizuru the following year.

Freight services between Tsuruga and Mitsumatsu ceased in 1997.

The line was electrified on March 15, 2003.

Stations

Rolling stock
The line uses single-car 125 series EMU cars, sometimes substituted by 521 series EMU cars.

Former
 KiHa 20
 KiHa 48
 KiHa 53
 KiHa 26・55
 KiHa 28・58
 113 series (until October 2006)

See also
 List of railway lines in Japan

References

 "JR Timetable" December 2008

External links
 Official guide site 

 
Lines of West Japan Railway Company
Railway lines opened in 1917
1067 mm gauge railways in Japan